This article lists all the further education colleges in Hampshire, England.  This list is part of a comprehensive list of schools in Hampshire, England. Hampshire County Council (HCC) organises the local education authority (LEA) schools into nine administrative areas.

List of Sixth Forms and Further Education Colleges 

This section includes sixth form colleges, secondary schools with sixth forms and FE inspections in higher education institutions.

Alton College (Further education college)
Andover College (Further education college)
Applemore College (Secondary school and sixth form)
The Arnewood School (Secondary school and sixth form)
Barton Peveril College (Further education college)
Basingstoke College of Technology (Further education college)
Bay House School (Secondary school and sixth form)
Brockenhurst College (Further education college)
The Burgate School and Sixth Form Centre (Secondary school and sixth form)
Eastleigh College (Further education college)
Fareham College (Further education college)
Farnborough College of Technology (Further education college)
Farnborough Sixth Form College (Further education college)
Havant College (Further education college)
Horndean Technology College (Secondary school and sixth form)
Minstead Training Project (Further education college)
New Forest Academy (Secondary school and sixth form)
Oaklands Catholic School (Secondary school and sixth form)
Peter Symonds College (Further education college)
 Portsmouth Grammar School (Primary, secondary school and sixth form)
Queen Mary's College, (Further education college)
Ringwood School (Secondary school and sixth form)
Sixth Form College Farnborough (Further education college)
South Downs College (Further education college)
Sparsholt College Hampshire (Further education college)
St Vincent College (Further education college)
Totton College (Further education college)
Treloar College (Further education college)
University of Winchester (Higher Education institution) (Further Education inspected only)
Yateley School (Secondary school and sixth form)

See also
List of schools in Hampshire

Education in Hampshire
Hampshire
Lists of buildings and structures in Hampshire